William Henry Mathews (1919–2003) was a Canadian geologist, volcanologist, engineer, and professor. He is considered a pioneer in the study of subglacial eruptions and volcano-ice interactions in North America. Many of his publications continue to be regarded as classics in their field.

Biography
Bill Mathews was born in Vancouver, British Columbia in 1919. His mother and a brother died when he was two; his father, Vancouver pioneer Thomas Mathews, died when he was 13.

Mathews attended King George Secondary School before entering the University of British Columbia in 1935, earning a Bachelor of Applied Science in geological engineering in 1940, followed by a Master of Applied Science with a major in petrology and a minor in physics in 1941. During college, he served as a student assistant for the Geological Survey of Canada from 1938 to 1941, and was also an instructor in the mountain infantry school of the Alpine Club of Canada, training personnel for the Canadian armed forces. After graduation, he worked as a mining engineer for the British Columbia Department of Mines from 1942 to 1946.

He then moved to the University of California, Berkeley, completing his Ph.D. in June 1948 with a dissertation titled Geology of the Mount Garibaldi map-area, southwestern British Columbia. While at Berkeley he met and married his wife, Laura Lu Mathews, served on the Berkeley faculty as an assistant professor from 1948 to 1951, and then returned to Canada to accept an associate professorship in the Department of Geography and Geology at the University of British Columbia. He was promoted to full professor in 1959, served as department chairman from 1964 to 1971, and continued teaching until his retirement to professor emeritus status in 1984.

Mathews received the Willet G. Miller Medal for "outstanding research in any branch of the earth sciences" from the Royal Society of Canada in 1989. After his retirement from teaching duties, he maintained an active research program and began writing a book on the geology of southern British Columbia, working part-time on the project until his death in 2003. The book was published posthumously in 2005 as Roadside Geology of Southern British Columbia.

Scientific research

Mathews scientific work embraced a broad spectrum of topics, including volcanoes, glaciers, regional geomorphology, landslides, hydrogeology, stratigraphy, coal geology, and mineral deposits. But his most influential work was in the fields of subglacial eruptions and volcano-ice interactions. He discovered several ideal field laboratories for this research in his home province of British Columbia, including the numerous volcanoes in Garibaldi Provincial Park just north of Vancouver and the remote Tuya Volcanic Field in far northern British Columbia. While still in graduate school at Berkeley in 1947, he published a paper, "Tuyas, Flat-Topped Volcanoes in Northern British Columbia", in which he coined the term "tuya" to refer to the distinctive, flat-topped, steep-sided volcanoes formed when lava erupts through a thick glacier or ice sheet. He took the name from Tuya Butte, a near-ideal specimen of the type, and this name has since become standard worldwide among volcanologists in referring to and writing about these volcanic formations. Late in his career, other scientists named a previously unnamed tuya in the Tuya Volcanic Field in honor of him as Mathews Tuya.

Mathews published his first article, titled "Geology of the Garibaldi Lake area", in the Canadian Alpine Journal in 1938 when he was only 19 years old. He would go on to author more than 100 published scientific papers and reports over the next six decades. A large portion of this body of work is devoted to the numerous fascinating volcanic, glacial, and limnological features of Garibaldi Provincial Park, which he examines, analyzes, and interprets in meticulous detail and with far-reaching insight.

Bibliography

Books and theses
  (includes biographical sketch)

Selected significant articles
 
 
  (see The Table)

Honors and memberships

References
 
 
 
 

1919 births
2003 deaths
20th-century Canadian geologists
Canadian glaciologists
Canadian volcanologists
Fellows of the Royal Society of Canada
Academic staff of the University of British Columbia
University of British Columbia alumni
University of California, Berkeley alumni
King George Secondary School alumni
Fellows of the Geological Society of America
Scientists from Vancouver